John I of Chalon-Auxerre (1243–1309) was a son of John, Count of Chalon and his second wife, Isabella van Courtenay - his brother was bishop Hugo III of Chalon.  John I married Adelaide of Auxerre and they ruled jointly as Count of Auxerre.  John was the father of William of Chalon.

1243 births
1309 deaths
Counts of Auxerre
Chalon-Arlay
Jure uxoris officeholders